The Edel 540 is a French sailboat, that was designed by Maurice Edel and first built in 1974. It was marketed as the Edel 545 in France and is sometimes referred to as the Edel 5.

Production
The design was built by Construction Nautic Edel in France and also at its Canadian subsidiary, Edel Canada. Between 1974 and 1983 a total of 2500 examples were completed. The boat is now out of production.

Design
The Edel 540 is a recreational keelboat, built predominantly of fiberglass. It has a fractional sloop, a raked stem, a vertical transom, a transom-hung rudder controlled by a tiller and a fixed fin keel. It displaces  and carries  of ballast.

The boat is normally fitted with a small outboard motor for docking and maneuvering.

Operational history
In a review Michael McGoldrick wrote, "...The 540 tends to compete with the Sandpiper 565, and it is a step up from those small sailboats that come with a minimalist cuddy cabin. In fact, they claim that the Edel 540's cabin has room to sleep 4 people, but this is probably more of an indication that there is sufficient room to sleep two adults in reasonable comfort. For its size, this 18 footer has a very wide beam (8 feet, or 2.44m). While the Edel 540 has a fix keel with 331 pounds of ballast, the wide beam provides for a lot of stability. It's nice looking boat and it tends to appeal to people who want a pocket cruiser that truly looks like a little yacht."

See also
List of sailing boat types

Related development
Edel 665

Similar sailboats
Com-Pac Sunday Cat
Hunter 18.5
Hunter 19-1
Nordica 16
Sandpiper 565
Siren 17

References

External links

Keelboats
1970s sailboat type designs
Sailing yachts
Sailboat type designs by Maurice Edel
Sailboat types built by Edel